John Martin Scurti is an American actor.

Scurti attended Fordham University, where he received a bachelor's degree in Fine Arts. One of his early major film roles was The Ref in 1994, in which he appeared with Denis Leary. He maintained a friendship with Leary, and in 2004 Leary asked him to play Lt. Ken Shea in the series Rescue Me. Scurti played Shea for all seven seasons of the show, and also contributed as a writer.

Through the 1990s and early 2000s, Scurti worked mainly in television, landing small roles on episodes of shows such as Murphy Brown, Baywatch Nights, Spin City, Sex and the City, The $treet, Law & Order, Ed, and Monk.  He appeared in two episodes of Marvel's Luke Cage, and in 2018 played a recurring character in the Netflix series The Good Cop.

Filmography

Writer

References

External links
 
 Interview with Gothamist

American male film actors
American male television actors
Fordham University alumni
Living people
Male actors from New York (state)
People from Northport, New York
Year of birth missing (living people)
American people of Italian descent